Josh Cassidy (born November 15, 1984, in Ottawa, Ontario) is a Canadian wheelchair racer.

In 2010, Cassidy won the 2010 London Marathon with a time of 1:35:21 seconds. In 2012, he won the 2012 Boston Marathon wheelchair race with a time of 1:18:25, which at the time was the fastest wheelchair marathon time ever recorded, though didn't count as a world record due to the Boston Marathon course being ineligible for world records.

Cassidy represented Canada at the 2008 Summer Paralympics, finishing 10th in the 5000m, 12th in the 1500m, and 17th in the 800m. At the 2012 Summer Paralympics, Cassidy placed 12th in the marathon, 20th in the 5000m, 10th in the 1500m, and 5th in the 800m.

In 2019, he won the Los Angeles Marathon.

Cassidy joined the Canadian team for the 2022 Commonwealth Games in Birmingham, and was named as co-flagbearer for the opening ceremony alongside weightlifter Maude Charron. He came in 4th in the men's T54 marathon.

Personal life
Josh Cassidy was born in Ottawa on November 15, 1984. He was diagnosed with neuroblastoma cancer in the spine and abdomen weeks after birth. He was given a very low chance of survival but was declared cancer-free after 5 years of remission, but it left his legs partially paralyzed. He is the oldest of ten children.

He has graduated from Sheridan College with a Bachelor of Applied Arts.

References

External links
 
 
 

1984 births
Living people
Canadian male wheelchair racers
Athletes from Ottawa
Paralympic track and field athletes of Canada
Athletes (track and field) at the 2008 Summer Paralympics
Athletes (track and field) at the 2012 Summer Paralympics
Athletes (track and field) at the 2016 Summer Paralympics
Paralympic wheelchair racers
Athletes (track and field) at the 2010 Commonwealth Games
Athletes (track and field) at the 2014 Commonwealth Games
Commonwealth Games medallists in athletics
Commonwealth Games bronze medallists for Canada
Medalists at the 2015 Parapan American Games
Athletes (track and field) at the 2022 Commonwealth Games
Medallists at the 2010 Commonwealth Games